Joseph Gibson "Beersheba" Pritchard (May 15, 1886 – July 14, 1947) was an American college football player and coach. Pritchard played for the Vanderbilt Commodores of Vanderbilt University. He was selected All-Southern in 1905 and 1906. He stood 6 foot 2 inches and weighed 185 pounds. Pritchard served as the head football coach at Louisiana State University (LSU) for part of one season in 1909, compiling a record is 4–1. He graduated from Vanderbilt in 1906 with a dental degree (DDS). A member of the Phi Delta Theta fraternity, he was later a Presbyterian dental missionary at Luebo in the Congo until he was forced to return to the United States due to poor health sometime before 1915.

In 1912, Pritchard married Annie Milicent Landrey of Jeanerette, Louisiana.

Head coaching record

*Last 3 games were coached by John W. Mayhew.

References

1886 births
1947 deaths
American football tackles
LSU Tigers football coaches
Vanderbilt Commodores football players
All-Southern college football players
Brown University alumni
People from Madison County, Mississippi
Coaches of American football from Mississippi
Players of American football from Mississippi